GO is the fifth studio album from the band Girugamesh, which was released on January 26, 2011 in Japan and on February 4 in Europe. Two editions of the album were released: a Regular Version CD and a Limited Version 2CD+DVD which includes the music videos for "COLOR [PV]" and "イノチノキ (Inochi no Ki) [PV]", a documentary, G-TRAVEL 2010 SUMMER, and a summarization of “Ura-Girugamesh” in 2010.

GO was released to various countries in Europe and to the United States during the Here we go!! world tour starting on March 5, 2011 at The Tochka in Moscow, Russia and ending on April 27, 2011 at the JAXX Night Club in Washington DC. Girugamesh has confirmed that the tour will be continuing in Japan starting on June 4, 2011 at the Hiroshima Namiki Junction in Hiroshima, Japan and ending on June 26, 2011 at the Zepp Tokyo in Tokyo, Japan.

Track listing

Regular Edition

 "Opening" - 1:30                                                                    
 "destiny" - 4:44                                                                     
 "EXIT" - 3:48                                                                         
 "MISSION CODE" - 3:36                                                                
 "COLOR" - 4:17                                                                       
 "13 days" - 4:18                                                                     
 "Mienai kyori" - 5:22                                                               
 "Saikai" - 5:28                                                                      
 "Calling" - 3:45                                                                     
 "Never ending story" - 4:33                                                           
 "Inochi no Ki" - 5:07

Limited Edition

Disc 1

 "Opening" - 1:30                                                                  
 "destiny" - 4:44                                                                   
 "EXIT" - 3:48  
 "COLOR" - 4:17                                                          
 "MISSION CODE" - 3:36                                                           
 "Mienai Kyori" - 5:22                                                                       
 "Saikai" - 5:28                                                                     
 "Never ending story" - 4:33                                                                     
 "Inochi no Ki" - 5:07

Disc 2 (FALL TOUR 2010 TOUR FINAL at Yokohama Bay Hall)

 "now(intro)"
 "bit crash"
 "NO MUSIC NO REASON"
 "Endless wing"
 "suiren"
 "CRAZY FLAG"
 "Dance Rock Night"
 "driving time"
 "DIRTY STORY"
 "Break Down"
 "shining"
 "arrow"

References

External links 
Girugamesh Discography (Maverick DC Group) 
Girugamesh Overseas Here we go!! Tour 
Giruamesh Japan Here we go!! Tour 
Giruamesh Discography 
iruamesh Live 

Girugamesh albums
2011 albums